The statistics of random permutations, such as the cycle structure of a random permutation are of fundamental importance in the analysis of algorithms, especially of sorting algorithms, which operate on random permutations. Suppose, for example, that we are using quickselect (a cousin of quicksort) to select a random element of a random permutation. Quickselect will perform a partial sort on the array, as it partitions the array according to the pivot. Hence a permutation will be less disordered after quickselect has been performed. The amount of disorder that remains may be analysed with generating functions. These generating functions depend in a fundamental way on the generating functions of random permutation statistics. Hence it is of vital importance to compute these generating functions.

The article on random permutations contains an introduction to random permutations.

The fundamental relation 

Permutations are sets of labelled cycles.

Translating into exponential generating functions (EGFs), we have

where we have used the fact that the EGF of the combinatorial species of permutations (there are n! permutations of n elements) is

This one equation allows one to derive a large number of permutation statistics.

because there are k! / k labelled cycles.  This means that by dropping terms from this generating function, we may constrain the size of the cycles that occur in a permutation and obtain an EGF of the permutations containing only cycles of a given size.

Instead of removing and selecting cycles, one can also put different weights on different size cycles. If  is a weight function that depends only on the size k of the cycle and for brevity we write

defining the value of b for a permutation  to be the sum of its values on the cycles, then we may mark cycles of length k with ub(k) and obtain a two-variable generating function 

This is a "mixed" generating function: it is an exponential generating function in z and an ordinary generating function in the secondary parameter u. Differentiating and evaluating at u = 1, we have

This is the probability generating function of the expectation of b.

This article uses the coefficient extraction operator [zn], documented on the page for formal power series.

Number of permutations that are involutions 

An involution is a permutation σ so that σ2 = 1 under permutation composition. It follows that σ may only contain cycles of length one or two, i.e. the exponential generating function g(z) of these permutations is

This gives the explicit formula for the total number  of involutions among the permutations σ ∈ Sn:

Dividing by n! yields the probability that a random permutation is an involution.
These numbers are known as telephone numbers.

Number of permutations that are mth roots of unity 

This generalizes the concept of an involution. An mth root of unity is a permutation σ so that σm = 1 under permutation composition. Now every time we apply σ we move one step in parallel along all of its cycles. A cycle of length d applied d times produces the identity permutation on d elements (d fixed points) and d is the smallest value to do so. Hence m must be a multiple of all cycle sizes d, i.e. the only possible cycles are those whose length d is a divisor of m. It follows that the EGF g(x) of these permutations is

When m = p, where p is prime, this simplifies to

Number of permutations of order exactly k
This one can be done by Möbius inversion. Working with the same concept as in the previous entry we note that the combinatorial species  of permutations whose order divides k is given by

Translation to exponential generating functions we obtain the EGF of permutations whose order divides k, which is

Now we can use this generating function to count permutations of order exactly k. Let  be the number of permutations on n whose order is exactly d and  the number of permutations on n the permutation count whose order divides k. 
Then we have

It follows by Möbius inversion that

Therefore, we have the EGF

The desired count is then given by 

This formula produces e.g. for k = 6 the EGF

with the sequence of values starting at n = 5
 

For k = 8 we get the EGF

with the sequence of values starting at n = 8
 

Finally for k = 12 we get the EGF

with the sequence of values starting at n = 7

Number of permutations that are derangements 

Suppose there are n people at a party, each of whom brought an umbrella. At the end of the party everyone picks an umbrella out of the stack of umbrellas and leaves. What is the probability that no one left with his/her own umbrella? This problem is equivalent to counting permutations with no fixed points (called derangements), and hence the EGF, where we subtract out fixed points (cycles of length 1)  by removing the term z from the fundamental relation is

Hence there are about  derangements and the probability that a random permutation is a derangement is 

This result may also be proved by inclusion–exclusion. Using the sets  where  to denote the set of permutations that fix p, we have

This formula counts the number of permutations that have at least one fixed point.
The cardinalities are as follows:

Hence the number of permutations with no fixed point is

 

or

 

and we have the claim.

There is a generalization of these numbers, which is known as rencontres numbers, i.e.
the number  of permutations of  containing m fixed points.
The corresponding EGF is obtained by marking cycles of size one with the variable u, 
the generating function  of the set of permutations by the number of fixed points:

 

It follows that

and hence

This immediately implies that

for n large, m fixed.

Order of a random permutation 

This is the least common multiple of the lengths of the cycles of P.

A theorem of Goh and Schmutz
states that if  is the expected order of a random permutation of size n, then

where the constant c is

Derangements containing an even and an odd number of cycles 

We can use the same construction as in the previous section to compute the number of derangements  containing an even number of cycles and the number  containing an odd number of cycles. To do this we need to mark all cycles and subtract fixed points, giving

We thus have

which is

The difference of these two ( and ) is

One hundred prisoners 

A prison warden wants to make room in his prison and is considering liberating one hundred prisoners, thereby freeing one hundred cells. He therefore assembles one hundred prisoners and asks them to play the following game: he lines up one hundred urns in a row, each containing the name of one prisoner, where every prisoner's name occurs exactly once. The game is played as follows: every prisoner is allowed to look inside fifty urns. If he or she does not find his or her name in one of the fifty urns, all prisoners will immediately be executed, otherwise the game continues. The prisoners have a few moments to decide on a strategy, knowing that once the game has begun, they will not be able to communicate with each other, mark the urns in any way or move the urns or the names inside them. Choosing urns at random, their chances of survival are almost zero, but there is a strategy giving them a 30% chance of survival, assuming that the names are assigned to urns randomly – what is it?

First of all, the survival probability using random choices is

so this is definitely not a practical strategy.

The 30% survival strategy is to consider the contents of the urns to be a permutation of the prisoners, and traverse cycles. To keep the notation simple, assign a number to each prisoner, for example by sorting their names alphabetically. The urns may thereafter be considered to contain numbers rather than names. Now clearly the contents of the urns define a permutation. The first prisoner opens the first urn. If he finds his name, he has finished and survives. Otherwise he opens the urn with the number he found in the first urn. The process repeats: the prisoner opens an urn and survives if he finds his name, otherwise he opens the urn with the number just retrieved, up to a limit of fifty urns. The second prisoner starts with urn number two, the third with urn number three, and so on. This strategy is precisely equivalent to a traversal of the cycles of the permutation represented by the urns. Every prisoner starts with the urn bearing his number and keeps on traversing his cycle up to a limit of fifty urns. The number of the urn that contains his number is the pre-image of that number under the permutation. Hence the prisoners survive if all cycles of the permutation contain at most fifty elements. We have to show that this probability is at least 30%.

Note that this assumes that the warden chooses the permutation randomly; if the warden anticipates this strategy, he can simply choose a permutation with a cycle of length 51. To overcome this, the prisoners may agree in advance on a random permutation of their names.

We consider the general case of  prisoners and  urns being opened. We first calculate the complementary probability, i.e. that there is a cycle of more than  elements. With this in mind, we introduce

or

so that the desired probability is

because the cycle of more than  elements will necessarily be unique. Using the fact that , we find that

which yields

Finally, using an integral estimate such as Euler–Maclaurin summation, or the asymptotic expansion of the nth harmonic number, we obtain

so that

or at least 30%, as claimed.

A related result is that asymptotically, the expected length of the longest cycle is λn, where λ is the Golomb–Dickman constant, approximately 0.62.

This example is due to Anna Gál and Peter Bro Miltersen;
consult the paper by Peter Winkler for more information, and
see the discussion on Les-Mathematiques.net.
Consult the references on 100 prisoners for links to these references.

Thus, if we denote 

then 

For , the number of permutations that contain a cycle of length exactly  is 

Explanation:
 is the number of ways of choosing the  elements that comprise the cycle;
 is the number of ways of arranging  items in a cycle; and 
 is the number of ways to permute the remaining elements.  There is no double counting here because there is at most one cycle of length  when .   Thus, 

We conclude that

A variation on the 100 prisoners problem (keys and boxes) 

There is a closely related problem that fits the method presented here quite nicely. Say you have n ordered boxes. Every box contains a key to some other box or possibly itself giving a permutation of the keys. You are allowed to select k of these n boxes all at once and break them open simultaneously, gaining access to k keys. What is the probability that using these keys you can open all n boxes, where you use a found key to open the box it belongs to and repeat.

The mathematical statement of this problem is as follows: pick a random permutation on n elements and k values from the range 1 to n, also at random, call these marks. What is the probability that there is at least one mark on every cycle of the permutation? The claim is this probability is k/n.

The species   of  permutations by
cycles with some non-empty subset  of every cycle being marked has the
specification

The index in the inner sum starts at one because we must  have at least one
mark on every cycle.

Translating the  specification to  generating functions we  obtain the
bivariate generating function

This simplifies to

or

In order to extract coefficients from this re-write like so

It now follows that

and hence

We do not need to divide by n! because  is exponential in z.

Number of permutations containing m cycles 

we obtain the generating function

The term

We can compute the OGF of the signed Stirling numbers for n fixed, i.e.

Start with

which yields

Summing this, we obtain

a falling factorial. The computation of the OGF of the unsigned Stirling numbers of the first kind works in a similar way.

Expected number of cycles of a given size m 

In this problem we use a bivariate generating function g(z, u) as described in the introduction.  The value of b for a cycle not of size m is zero, and one for a cycle of size m. We have

or

This means that the expected number of cycles of size m in a permutation of length n less than m is zero (obviously). A random permutation of length at least m contains on average 1/m cycles of length m. In particular, a random permutation contains about one fixed point.

The OGF of the expected number of cycles of length less than or equal to m is therefore

where Hm is the mth harmonic number. Hence the expected number of cycles of length at most m in a random permutation is about ln m.

Moments of fixed points 

The mixed GF  of the set of permutations by the number of fixed points is

Let the random variable X be the number of fixed points of a random permutation.
Using Stirling numbers of the second kind, we have the following formula for the mth moment of X:

where  is a falling factorial.
Using , we have

which is zero when , and one otherwise. 
Hence only terms with  contribute to the sum.
This yields

Expected number of fixed points in random permutation raised to some power k 
Suppose you pick a random permutation  and raise it to some power , with  a positive integer and ask about the expected number of fixed points in the result.

For every divisor  of  a cycle of length  splits into  fixed points when raised to the power  Hence we need to mark these cycles with  To illustrate this consider 

We get

which is

Once more continuing as described in the introduction, we find

which is

The general procedure is

Once more continuing as before, we find

Expected number of cycles of any length of a random permutation 

We construct the bivariate generating function  using , where  is one for all cycles (every cycle contributes one to the total number of cycles).

Note that  has the closed form

and generates the unsigned Stirling numbers of the first kind.

We have

Number of permutations with a cycle of length larger than n/2 

(Note that Section One hundred prisoners contains exactly the same problem with a very similar calculation, plus also a simpler elementary proof.)

or

which is

It follows that the answer is

The sum has an alternate representation that one encounters e.g. in the OEIS .

finally giving

Expected number of transpositions of a random permutation 

We can use the disjoint cycle decomposition of a permutation to factorize it as a product of transpositions by replacing a cycle of length k by k − 1 transpositions.

and

Hence the expected number of transpositions  is

where  is the  Harmonic number.
We could also have obtained this formula by noting that the number of transpositions is obtained by adding the lengths of all cycles (which gives n) and subtracting one for every cycle (which gives  by the previous section).

Note that  again generates the unsigned Stirling numbers of the first kind, but in reverse order. More precisely, we have

To see this, note that the above is equivalent to

and that

which we saw to be the EGF of the unsigned Stirling numbers of the first kind in the section on permutations consisting of precisely m cycles.

Expected cycle size of a random element 

We select a random element q of a random permutation  and ask about the expected size of the cycle that contains q. Note that unlike the previous computations, we need to average out this parameter after we extract it from the generating function (divide by n). We have

Hence the expected length of the cycle that contains q is

Probability that a random element lies on a cycle of size m 

We have

It follows that the probability that a random element lies on a cycle of length m is

Probability that a random subset of [n] lies on the same cycle 

Select a random subset Q of [n] containing m elements and a random permutation, and ask about the probability that all elements of Q lie on the same cycle. This is another average parameter. This yields

Averaging out we obtain that the probability of the elements of Q being on the same cycle is

or

In particular, the probability that two elements  are on the same cycle is 1/2.

Number of permutations containing an even number of even cycles 

We may use the Flajolet–Sedgewick fundamental theorem directly and compute more advanced permutation statistics. (Check that page for an explanation of how the operators we will use are computed.) For example, the set of permutations containing an even number of even cycles is given by

Translating to exponential generating functions (EGFs), we obtain

or

This simplifies to

or

Permutations that are squares 

Consider what happens when we square a permutation. Fixed points are mapped to fixed points. Odd cycles are mapped to odd cycles in a one-to-one correspondence, e.g.  turns into . Even cycles split in two and produce a pair of cycles of half the size of the original cycle, e.g.  turns into . Hence permutations that are squares may contain any number of odd cycles, and an even number of cycles of size two, an even number of cycles of size four etc., and are given by

which yields the EGF

Odd cycle invariants 

The types of permutations presented in the preceding two sections, i.e. permutations containing an even number of even cycles and permutations that are squares, are examples of so-called odd cycle invariants, studied by Sung and Zhang (see external links). The term odd cycle invariant simply means that membership in the respective combinatorial class is independent of the size and number of odd cycles occurring in the permutation. In fact we can prove that all odd cycle invariants obey a simple recurrence, which we will derive. First, here are some more examples of odd cycle invariants.

Permutations where the sum of the lengths of the even cycles is six

This class has the specification

and the generating function

The first few values are

Permutations where all even cycles have the same length

This class has the specification

and the generating function

There is a semantic nuance here.  We could consider permutations containing no even cycles as belonging to this class, since zero is even. The first few values are

Permutations where the maximum length of an even cycle is four

This class has the specification

and the generating function

The first few values are

The recurrence

Observe carefully how the specifications of the even cycle component are constructed. It is best to think of them in terms of parse trees. These trees have three levels. The nodes at the lowest level represent sums of products of even-length cycles of the singleton . The nodes at the middle level represent restrictions of the set operator. Finally the node at the top level sums products of contributions from the middle level. Note that restrictions of the set operator, when applied to a generating function that is even, will preserve this feature, i.e. produce another even generating function. But all the inputs to the set operators are even since they arise from even-length cycles. The result is that all generating functions involved have the form

where  is an even function. This means that

is even, too, and hence

Letting  and extracting coefficients, we find that

which yields the recurrence

A problem from the 2005 Putnam competition 

A link to the Putnam competition website appears in the section 
External links.
The problem asks for a proof that

 if  is even and
 if  is odd, and

as explained e.g. on the page on even and odd permutations.

Hence we consider the combinatorial class

where  marks one minus the length of a contributing cycle,
and  marks fixed points. Translating to generating functions, we obtain

or
 

Now we have

and hence the desired quantity is given by

Doing the computation, we obtain

or

The constant is one, which does not agree with the formula (should be zero). 
For  positive, however, we obtain

or

which is the desired result.

As an interesting aside, we observe that  may be used to evaluate the following determinant of an  matrix:

where . Recall the formula for the determinant:

Hence

which yields

and finally

The difference between the number of cycles in even and odd permutations 
Here we seek to show that this difference is given by

Recall that the sign  of a permutation  is given by

It follows that the combinatorial species  that reflects the signs and the cycle count of the set of permutations is given by

Translating to generating functions we have

This simplifies to

which is

 
and

We require the quantity

which is

Finally, extracting coefficients from this generating function, we obtain

which is

which is in turn

This concludes the proof.

See also 

 Golomb–Dickman constant

References

External links 

 
 Marko Riedel et al., The difference of number of cycles of even and odd permutations
 Marko Riedel et al., Keys inside closed boxes, a question on probability

100 prisoners 
 Various authors, Permutations with a cycle > n/2
 Various authors, A property of derangements
 Various authors, Expected number of fixed points
 Peter Winkler, Seven puzzles you think you must not have heard correctly
 Various authors, Les-Mathematiques.net. Cent prisonniers 

Combinatorics